Nectar is the sugar-rich liquid produced by the flowers of plants, in order to attract pollinating animals.
Nectar may also refer to:

Nectar, originally a name of the food or drink of the gods in Greek mythology; see ambrosia
Nectar (drink), a fruit juice beverage

Places
Nectar, Alabama, a town in central Alabama
Mare Nectaris, the Sea of Nectar, a geographic feature of the Moon
Nectar Covered Bridge, a former covered bridge in Alabama

Companies
Nectar d.o.o., a Serbian beverage company
 Northeast Connecticut Telephone and Ride (NECTAR), predecessor to the Northeastern Connecticut Transit District

Science and technology
 Nectar (National eResearch Collaboration Tools and Resources), now part of Australian Research Data Commons
Nectar Lifesciences, an Indian pharmaceutical organisation
Nectar source, a flowering plant that produces nectar

Other uses
 Nectar, a fictional performance-enhancing drug in Free Radical Design's PS3 game, HAZE
Nectar (loyalty card), a loyalty card issued by a partnership of United Kingdom retailers
Nectar (Enanitos Verdes album), 1999
Nectar (Joji album), 2020

See also
Nektar, a 1970s English/German progressive rock band based in Germany